Glenn A. Cummings was a Democratic member of the Maine House of Representatives, representing the state's 115th district. He served from 2000 to 2008, including one term as the Speaker of the House, and was termed out of office in 2008. In 2000, when he first ran for the District 115 seat, Cummings became the first candidate in Maine history to qualify for public financing under Maine's new "Clean Elections" law. In 2009, Cummings was appointed deputy assistant secretary for the Office of Vocational & Adult Education. Cummings worked for the Goodwill Hinckley School in Fairfield, Maine as president and executive director.

On September 2, 2014, University of Maine System Chancellor James H. Page announced Cummings' appointment as interim president of the University of Maine at Augusta, succeeding Allyson Hughes Handley, Ed.D.

On May 21, 2015, Page announced Cummings would become the 13th president of the University of Southern Maine, effective July 1, 2015.

On October 5, 2021, Cummings announced he would be stepping down as president on June 30, 2022. He will remain at the university as faculty.

References

https://web.archive.org/web/20120512052216/http://makinghistory.upenn.edu/files/u7/glenncummings.jpg

External links 
Representative Glenn Cummings official government website
Maine Speaker of the House Glenn Cummings official government website
Project Vote Smart - Representative Glenn A. Cummings (ME) profile
Follow the Money – Glenn A. Cummings
2006 2004 2002 2000 campaign contributions
 
 

1961 births
Living people
Ohio Wesleyan University alumni
Brown University alumni
Harvard University alumni
Politicians from Portland, Maine
People from Bath, Maine
University of Pennsylvania alumni
Speakers of the Maine House of Representatives
Majority leaders of the Maine House of Representatives
Presidents of the University of Southern Maine